Jane Coad is a New Zealand public health nutrition researcher and professor in nutrition at Massey University. She is co-director of Massey's Vitamin D Research Centre which she and Pam von Hurst founded in 2010.

Academic career 
In September 2015 Coad was promoted to full professor at Massey University, with effect from 1 January 2016.

In addition to her work in nutrition, Coad is co-author of Anatomy and Physiology for Midwives, now in its 4th edition.

Selected publications

Book

Journal articles

References

External links 

 

Living people
Year of birth missing (living people)
Academic staff of the Massey University
New Zealand women academics
Public health researchers